Arias is a city in the province of Córdoba, Argentina.

References

External links
 Arias official website

Populated places in Córdoba Province, Argentina
Cities in Argentina
Argentina